Mount Ball is a mountain located on the Continental Divide, on the borders of Banff and Kootenay national parks in Western Canada. Mt. Ball is the highest peak of the Ball Range in the Canadian Rockies.

The mountain was named in 1858 by James Hector after John Ball, a politician who helped secure funding for the Palliser expedition. The name was officially adopted in 1924 based on Palliser's 1863 map of British North America.

Mt. Ball can be ascended from a scrambling route by late summer but involves remote bushwhacking, which limits the number of attempts per year. The trailhead is located at the Marble Canyon Campground in Kootenay National Park.

Geology

Mount Ball is composed of sedimentary rock laid down during the Precambrian to Jurassic periods. Formed in shallow seas, this sedimentary rock was pushed east and over the top of younger rock during the Laramide orogeny.

Climate

Based on the Köppen climate classification, Mount Ball is located in a subarctic climate zone with cold, snowy winters, and mild summers. Winter temperatures can drop below −20 °C with wind chill factors below −30 °C. This climate supports glaciers on its slopes. Precipitation runoff from the east slope drains to the Bow River via Redearth Creek, and the west slope drains into tributaries of the Vermilion River .

References

Three-thousanders of Alberta
Three-thousanders of British Columbia
Canadian Rockies
Borders of Alberta
Borders of British Columbia